Tuskacheshmeh Rural District is a rural district (dehestan) in the Central District of Galugah County, Mazandaran Province, Iran. At the 2006 census, its population was 4,930, in 1,285 families. The rural district has 15 villages.

References 

Rural Districts of Mazandaran Province
Galugah County